"Merrymaking at My Place" is a song by Scottish musician Calvin Harris. It was released as the third single from Harris' debut studio album, I Created Disco (2007), on 20 August 2007. The radio edit which appears on the single has an altered chorus and several altered verses in order to remove all apparent drug references from the song. Despite some airplay and video play, the single failed to reach the top 40 on the UK Singles Chart, making it to number 43 on full release.

Music video 
The music video, directed by Kinga Burza features Calvin and his friends enjoying themselves to the song, in what appears to be Calvin's grandmother's house.  The location is assumed when Calvin talks to his grandmother on the telephone, just moments before his friends arrive. At the end of the video, Calvin's grandmother arrives home to find the house in a mess and has a heart attack.

Track listing

Charts

References

2007 singles
Calvin Harris songs
Songs written by Calvin Harris
2007 songs